Coronda is a small city in the . It is located in the San Jerónimo Department, 43 km south from the provincial capital (Santa Fe). It has a population of about 18,000 inhabitants.

The town was founded in 1867 by Governor Nicasio Oroño, and became a city on 6 February 1860.

Its parish church was designed by Carlo Zucchi.

Notable people
 Carlota Garrido de la Peña (1870-1958), journalist, writer, teacher

References

 
 

Populated places in Santa Fe Province
Cities in Argentina
Argentina
Santa Fe Province